Depressaria moranella is a moth of the family Depressariidae. It is found in Algeria and North Macedonia.

The wingspan is 16–18 mm.

The larvae feed on Hoplophyllum tuberculatum.

References

External links
lepiforum.de

Moths described in 1907
Depressaria
Moths of Africa
Moths of Europe